Sagarmatha may refer to: 
The Nepalese name for Mount Everest
Sagarmatha Zone
Sagarmatha National Park
Radio Sagarmatha
Sagarmatha Highway
Sagarmatha Airport
Sagarmatha (album), an album by the Appleseed Cast
Sagarmatha, official name of star HD 100777 in the Leo constellation